Charny is a commune in the Côte-d'Or department in eastern France.

History
On 16 September 1911, Edouard Nieuport, racing pilot and airplane designer, dies a day after an airplane accident while landing at the Military Aerodrome in Charny in bad weather.

Population

See also
Communes of the Côte-d'Or department

References

Communes of Côte-d'Or